Mirer khil is a village of Bhujpur union in Bangladesh. 49 km from Chittagong city the village is some part of East Bhujpur mouza and some part of Fakirachang mouza.

Etymology
In Bengali language Mirer means of the Mirs and Khil is a Sanskrit word, means wasteland, uncultivated fallow Farmland or Farmhouse. In Nāradasmṛti, khil meaning that land, which is not cultivated for three years. The meaning of Mirerkhil is “the uncultivated Farmland of Mirs”.

Geography

The village Mirerkhil is situated between two hills, Sitakunda hill and hills of Chittagong hill tracts. Village is bounded by Green paddy fields, water tanks and large Nodhailla Dhoba. Famous river of Chittagong district Halda River is flowing outer skirt of village. Village's direct angular distance from Bay of Bengal is 22 km and Sitakunda hills situated between sea and the village. Amtali village is to north, in east side Fakirachang village and in west side is Azimpur Mouza. There are some water tanks by name Mirer Pukur, Khondakar Pukur, Azala Pukr & Bania Pukur of pre British period available in the village.

History
As per known history the village is named after zamindar of the area Mir Muhammad Sana. Local peoples call Mirer Pukur the tank which is situated in front of the Mirerkhil Jame mosque. 
The area is mentioned in old records as Taraf Mir Muhammad Sana but CS Cadestral Survey mentioned the area as Gasbaria. Gasbaria Primary School & Gasbaria field is bearing memory of that.

Population
Population of the village is approx. 1300.

Educational and other institutions

There is a government Primary School, a Madrassa, a women's Madrassa, three mosques and a Jame Mosque in the village.
Gasbaria Primary School
Mirerkhil Abu Horaira Madrassah
Mirerkhil Mahila Madrassah
Mirerkhil Jame Mosque

Communication 
Regional Highway “R151” (48 km long) touched Mirerkhil when it meets with Dhaka-Chittagong national highway at Baroiar Hat via Heako. Busses travel Fakir Hat from Chittagong city Oxygen Bus Stand in every hour.

Marketplaces and bazars

Fakir Hat is the main marketplace in the village. Distance between Chittagong city and Fakir Hat is 49 km.

See also
 List of villages in Bangladesh

References

Villages in Chittagong District
Villages in Chittagong Division